Stuart Ian Nicholson (born 3 February 1987) is a former professional footballer, currently playing in Melbourne, Australia, for Springvale City FC.

Stuart was also a former England Under-19 international

Career

West Bromwich Albion
Nicholson, made his debut for West Bromwich Albion on 17 January 2006, coming on as an extra-time substitute in a 3–2 FA Cup defeat away at Reading. He made his Premiership debut four days later in the 1–0 loss against Sunderland at The Hawthorns, when he replaced Nathan Ellington, whom he describes as his childhood hero. He won the West Bromwich Albion Young Player of the Year award for 2005–06 and earned the nickname "The Knife" for his sharpness in front of goal. He was given a place in the first team squad for the 2006–07 season, and marked his first start with a goal against Leyton Orient on 24 August in the first round of the League Cup.

Bristol Rovers
Nicholson joined Bristol Rovers on loan in November 2006. Unusually for someone born in the north-east of England, he has been a fan of the club since being given a Bristol Rovers shirt as a present when he was 14. The loan was due to last three months, but Nicholson was recalled four weeks early by West Brom, before returning to Bristol Rovers for a second loan spell during the same season.

He scored a brace on 17 March 2007 against Notts County and followed it up with the winner against Stockport County on 20 March, both games at the Memorial Stadium. A stomach injury then kept him out of the team, and his loan spell was cut short in April when he returned to West Brom to have a hernia operation.

Shrewsbury Town
In August 2007 Nicholson joined Shrewsbury Town on a scheduled season-long loan. However, Nicholson did not see eye to eye with Gary Peters and by December he had found the net just once for the Shrews in 14 league appearances. On 18 December it was announced that he had returned to Albion due to an ongoing "personal problem", with his loan spell at Shrewsbury set to be officially ended in January.

Wrexham
On 18 January 2008 Nicholson joined Wrexham on a three-month loan deal. In April Albion confirmed that they would release the player in the summer when his existing contract expires.

Newcastle Blue Star
He signed with Newcastle Blue Star in August 2008.

On 7 November Nicholson joined AFC Bournemouth on a week's trial, Bournemouth could not meet the asking price having been made available for transfer by Newcastle Blue Star after making five substitute appearances scoring in all up to that point in the 2008–09 season. After having been released by Blue Star midway through the 2008–09 season, Nicholson trained with Blyth Spartans

Tamworth
Nicholson's next move was a return to the midlands to team up with Conference North side Tamworth in January, 2009. He made his debut for Tamworth on 27 January 2009 against King's Lynn in a home Conference North fixture in a year that Tamworth won promotion to the Conference National. Stuart was given the number 9 shirt and after 2 months he handed in a transfer request due to the fact Mills wanted to play him as a lone striker and at Nicholsons stature and to the dislike of Gary Mills he was put on gardening leave.

Preston Lions FC
Preston Lions FC has signed former West Bromwich Albion striker Stuart Nicholson for the 2015 Victorian State League 1 NW season. Stuart comes across from Moreland Zebras where he spent two years and it is the first new summer signing for coach Andy O'Dell, who says the addition of the pacey striker as 'an excellent opportunity both for player and club'.

References

External links

West Bromwich Albion player profile

1987 births
Living people
Footballers from Newcastle upon Tyne
English footballers
England youth international footballers
Association football forwards
West Bromwich Albion F.C. players
Bristol Rovers F.C. players
Shrewsbury Town F.C. players
Wrexham A.F.C. players
Newcastle Blue Star F.C. players
Tamworth F.C. players
AFC Telford United players
West Allotment Celtic F.C. players
Caroline Springs George Cross FC players
Northcote City FC players
Birtley Town F.C. players
Hebburn Town F.C. players
Bentleigh Greens SC players
Moreland Zebras FC players
Jarrow Roofing Boldon Community Association F.C. players
FC Clifton Hill players
St Albans Saints SC players
Preston Lions FC players
Westgate FC players
Premier League players
English Football League players
National League (English football) players
Expatriate soccer players in Australia